Rachana mioae is a butterfly of the family Lycaenidae first described by Hisakazu Hayashi in 1978. Eliotia mioae H. Hayashi, 1978 was moved to Rachana, because Eliotia is the junior homonym of a genus of marine animals (nudibranchs, family: Madrellidae) described in 1909.

Forewing length: 16–20 mm. It is endemic to the Philippines. It is uncommon and distributed on the islands of Mindanao and Leyte.

References

Hayashi, Hisakazu (1978). "Lycaenid Butterflies from Mindanao, with the descriptions of new Genus, new Species and new Subspecies (Lepidoptera: Lycaenidae)". Tyô to Ga. 29 (3): 164-168.
Treadaway, Colin G. (1995). "Checklisit of the butterflies of the Philippine Islands (Lepidoptera: Rhopalocera)". Nachrichten des Entomologischen Vereins Apollo. Suppl. 14: 7–118.

Treadaway, Colin G. & Schröder, Heinz G. (2012). "Revised checklist of the butterflies of the Philippine Islands (Lepidoptera: Rhopalocera)". Nachrichten des Entomologischen Vereins Apollo. Suppl. 20: 1-64.

External links
 With images.

Butterflies described in 1984
Iolaini